Select Committee on Intelligence can refer to:

The Pike Committee (established 1975, mandate expired 1976, no report)
The United States Senate Select Committee on Intelligence (permanent, established 1976)
The United States House Permanent Select Committee on Intelligence (established 1977, replacing Pike Committee)